This is a list of awards and nominations received by American actor, comedian, singer, voice actor, screenwriter, and producer John C. Reilly.

Major associations

Academy Awards

Golden Globe Awards

Grammy Award

Independent Spirit Awards

Screen Actors Guild Awards

Tony Award

Miscellaneous associations

Boston Society of Film Critics

Critics' Choice Movie Awards

Detroit Film Critics Society

Florida Film Critics Circle

Golden Raspberry Awards

Gotham Awards

Las Vegas Film Critics Society

MTV Movie & TV Awards

Phoenix Film Critics Society

Satellite Awards

Stinkers Bad Movie Awards

External links
 

Reilly, John C